Sebastián Alberto Blázquez (born 27 November 1979) is a retired Argentine football goalkeeper.

Career
Blázquez started his playing career in 1997 with Talleres de Remedios de Escalada in the Regionalised 3rd division of Argentine football. In 2002, he was signed by Vélez Sársfield of the Argentine Primera, but he only made one competitive appearance in his two years with the club.

In 2004 Blázquez joined San Martín de San Juan of the 2nd division and in 2006 he returned to the Primera with Colón de Santa Fe where he was again used as a reserve goalkeeper until he got a run in the first team in late 2007. In 2009 played in Colombia for Deportivo Cali, before on 29 December 2009 the Goalkeeper left Cali to join Olimpia Asuncion on a 50% joint ownership deal with Colón de Santa Fe.

On 27 November 2019, 40-year old Blázquez announced his retirement from football.

References

External links

 Sebastián Blázquez – Argentine Primera statistics at Fútbol XXI  
 Football-Lineups player profile
 

1979 births
Living people
Sportspeople from Bahía Blanca
Argentine footballers
Association football goalkeepers
Talleres de Remedios de Escalada footballers
Club Atlético Vélez Sarsfield footballers
San Martín de San Juan footballers
Club Atlético Colón footballers
Deportivo Cali footballers
Club Olimpia footballers
Club Atlético Patronato footballers
Independiente Rivadavia footballers
Club Atlético Belgrano footballers
Mushuc Runa S.C. footballers
S.D. Aucas footballers
Villa Dálmine footballers
Deportivo Laferrere footballers
Argentine Primera División players
Categoría Primera A players
Paraguayan Primera División players
Ecuadorian Serie A players
Argentine expatriate footballers
Expatriate footballers in Colombia
Expatriate footballers in Paraguay
Expatriate footballers in Ecuador
Argentine expatriate sportspeople in Colombia
Argentine expatriate sportspeople in Ecuador
Argentine expatriate sportspeople in Paraguay